Simisola is a 1994 novel by British crime writer Ruth Rendell. It features her recurring detective Inspector Wexford, and is the 17th in the series.  Though a murder mystery, the book also touches on the themes of racism and welfare dependency.

Plot summary
Dr Raymond Akande is Wexford's new GP and one of the few Black British people in Kingsmarkham.  When Akande's daughter goes missing, and a body of a young black woman is found, Wexford is confronted by his own prejudices.

Critical reception
The Daily Courier wrote about the book: "...some of it gets tedious, especially when characters who do not consider themselves racists search themselves for racist traits".

Film, TV or theatrical adaptations
The novel was adapted into a television film in the UK in 1996 and starred George Baker, Christopher Ravenscroft, Jane Lapotaire, and George Harris.

References

 

1994 British novels
Novels by Ruth Rendell
Hutchinson (publisher) books
British novels adapted into films
Inspector Wexford series
Novels about racism